"You May See Me Walkin'" is a song written by Tom Uhr, and recorded by American country music artist Ricky Skaggs.  It was released in August 1981 as the second single from the album Waitin' for the Sun to Shine.  The song reached #9 on the Billboard Hot Country Singles chart.

Chart performance

References

1981 singles
1981 songs
Ricky Skaggs songs
Song recordings produced by Ricky Skaggs
Epic Records singles